Acacia horridula is a shrub belonging to the genus Acacia and the subgenus Phyllodineae that is endemic to south western Australia.

Description
Like most species of Acacia it has phyllodes rather than true leaves. The evergreen patent phyllodes are usually crowded on the branchlets and have a narrowly semi-trullate shape. The simple inflorescences occur singly in the axils with spherical heads containing four pale yellow flowers.

Taxonomy
The species was first formally described by the botanist Carl Meissner in 1844 as part of the work Leguminosae in Plantae Preissianae'. It was reclassified as Racosperma horridulum by Leslie Pedley in 2003 and then transferred back to genus Acacia in 2006.
 
Distribution
It is native to an area along the south coast in the Peel and South West regions of Western Australia. It is often situated on rocky hillsides growing in sandy or gravelly soils over granite particularly in the Darling Range usually as a part of Eucalyptus'' woodland communities.

See also
List of Acacia species

References

horridula
Acacias of Western Australia
Plants described in 1844
Taxa named by Carl Meissner